József Ács may refer to:

József Ács (painter) (1914–1990), Yugoslav painter, art teacher and art critic
József Ács (sculptor) (born 1931), Hungarian sculptor and medalist
József Ács (musician) (born 1948), German composer, pianist and organist of Hungarian origin
József Ács (author) (born 1965), Hungarian writer